PB-48 Pishin-IIis a constituency of the Provincial Assembly of Balochistan.

General elections 2013

General elections 2008

See also

 PB-47 Pishin-I
 PB-49 Killa Abdullah

References

External links
 Election commission Pakistan's official website
 Awazoday.com check result
 Balochistan's Assembly official site

Constituencies of Balochistan